Johnson's Creamery is a historic creamery building located at Bloomington, Monroe County, Indiana.  The original section was built about 1914, and is a two-story, rectangular, red brick building.  Additions were made to the original building until 1951, and are all constructed of red brick with parapets. The iconic smokestack dates to 1949. Johnson's Creamery vacated the building in 1987.

It was listed on the National Register of Historic Places in 1996. It is located in the Bloomington West Side Historic District.

References

Industrial buildings and structures on the National Register of Historic Places in Indiana
Industrial buildings completed in 1914
Buildings and structures in Bloomington, Indiana
National Register of Historic Places in Monroe County, Indiana
Historic district contributing properties in Indiana